Leptodeira ornata, the northern cat-eyed snake, is a species of snake in the family Colubridae.  The species is native to Panama, Colombia, and Ecuador.

References

Leptodeira
Snakes of Central America
Snakes of South America
Reptiles of Panama
Reptiles of Colombia
Reptiles of Ecuador
Reptiles described in 1884
Taxa named by Marie Firmin Bocourt